Felipe Guevara Stephens (born 5 August 1967) is a Chilean historian and politician.

Guevara served as mayor of the commune of Lo Barnechea for eleven years until the 2019–20 riots ("Estallido Social"), when he accepted then President Sebastián Piñera's offer to becom intendant of capital city, Santiago de Chile, replacing Karla Rubilar, who'd been selected by Piñera to be Minister Secretary General of Government.

References

External links
 

1967 births
Living people
National Renewal (Chile) politicians
Pontifical Catholic University of Chile alumni
Adolfo Ibáñez University alumni
People from Santiago
21st-century Chilean politicians
Chilean historians